Cheget is a "nuclear briefcase" (named after  in Kabardino-Balkaria) and a part of the automatic system for the command and control of Russia's Strategic Nuclear Forces (SNF) named Kazbek (named after Mount Kazbek on the Georgia–Russia border). From when it was first developed, a "nuclear suitcase" has been available to the Russian head of state, Minister of Defense and the head of the General Staff.

History
The cheget was developed during Yuri Andropov's administration in the early 1980s. The suitcase was put into service just as Mikhail Gorbachev took office as General Secretary of the Central Committee of the Communist Party of the Soviet Union in March 1985. It is connected to the special communications system code-named Kavkaz (the Russian name for the Caucasus region), which "supports communication between senior government officials while they are making the decision whether to use nuclear weapons, and in its own turn is plugged into Kazbek, which embraces all the individuals and agencies involved in command and control of the Strategic Nuclear Forces."

The President of Russia (the Supreme Commander-in-Chief) has a cheget on hand at all times. It is one of three, with the other two held by the Minister of Defence and the Chief of the General Staff. It may be that affirmations from two of the three are needed to trigger an actual launch. The General Staff receives the signal and initiates the nuclear strike through the passing of authorization codes to missile silo launch complexes/ballistic missile submarines or by remotely launching individual land-based intercontinental ballistic missiles (ICBMs)/submarine-launched ballistic missiles (SLBMs).

On 25 January 1995, in the Norwegian rocket incident, the cheget was activated in response to a misidentified Brant XII four-stage sounding rocket, launched by Norwegian and U.S. scientists; it was the only known time a nuclear briefcase has been activated in preparation for an attack.

Gallery

See also

 Designated survivor
 Nuclear football – the American counterpart
 Letters of last resort – the British version
 Two-man rule
 Cold War
 War
 Nuclear warfare
 World War II
 Dead Hand – Soviet nuclear-control system

References

Nuclear command and control
Military communications
Strategic Rocket Forces
Presidency of Russia